Mowbray Herald of Arms Extraordinary was an English officer of arms. From the time of King Richard II to that of Henry VI, Mowbray was the Duke of Norfolk's private herald. Since its revival in 1623 the title has always been given to a herald extraordinary. Though an officer of the crown, Mowbray Herald Extraordinary was not a member of the corporation of the College of Arms in London. Sir William le Neve appears to have been appointed to the office from 29 June 1624 until his appointment as York Herald the following year. The office was recreated in January 1695 for Robert Plot, who was made Registrar of the College of Heralds just two days later and was subsequently held by Joseph Edmondson.

Holders of the office

See also
Heraldry
Herald
Robert Plot
Officer of Arms

References
Citations

Bibliography
 The College of Arms, Queen Victoria Street : being the sixteenth and final monograph of the London Survey Committee, Walter H. Godfrey, assisted by Sir Anthony Wagner, with a complete list of the officers of arms, prepared by H. Stanford London, (London, 1963)
 A History of the College of Arms &c, Mark Noble, (London, 1804)

External links
The College of Arms
CUHGS Officer of Arms Index

English offices of arms